The 2015 Grand Prix SAR La Princesse Lalla Meryem was a professional tennis tournament played on clay courts. It was the 15th edition of the tournament and part of the WTA International tournaments category of the 2015 WTA Tour. It took place at the Royal Tennis Club de Marrakech in Marrakesh, Morocco, between 26 April and 2 May 2015.

Points and prize money

Point distribution

Prize money

Singles main draw entrants

Seeds 

 1 Rankings as of April 20, 2015

Other entrants 
The following players received wildcards into the singles main draw:
  Rita Atik
  Daria Kasatkina
  Garbiñe Muguruza

The following players received entry as qualifiers:
  María Irigoyen
  Teliana Pereira
  Laura Siegemund
  Alison Van Uytvanck

The following player received entry as a lucky loser:
  Urszula Radwańska

Withdrawals 
Before the tournament
  Kiki Bertens → replaced by Lara Arruabarrena
  Zarina Diyas → replaced by Tímea Babos
  Alexandra Dulgheru → replaced by Donna Vekić
  Kirsten Flipkens → replaced by Evgeniya Rodina
  Johanna Larsson → replaced by Tatjana Maria
  Francesca Schiavone (illness) → replaced by Urszula Radwańska
  Peng Shuai → replaced by Marina Erakovic

Doubles main draw entrants

Seeds 

 1 Rankings as of April 20, 2015

Other entrants 
The following pairs received wildcards into the doubles main draw:
  Rita Atik /  Zaineb El Houari
  Ghita Benhadi /  Ilze Hattingh

Champions

Singles 

  Elina Svitolina def.  Tímea Babos, 7–5, 7–6(7–3)

Doubles 

  Tímea Babos /  Kristina Mladenovic def.  Laura Siegemund /  Maryna Zanevska, 6–1, 7–6(7–5)

References

External links 
 

Grand Prix SAR La Princesse Lalla Meryem
Morocco Open
2015 in Moroccan tennis